Go Sport–Roubaix–Lille Métropole is a French UCI Continental cycling team founded in 2007. For the 2019 season, the team secured additional sponsorship from Natura4Ever, later rebranded as Xelliss in 2021.

Team roster

Major wins

2009
Stage 3 Tour du Gévaudan Languedoc-Roussillon, Florian Vachon
2010
Stage 4 Étoile de Bessèges, Arnaud Molmy
Grand Prix de la Ville de Lillers, Benoît Daeninck
Paris–Troyes, Cédric Pineau
Stage 3 Tour de Bretagne, Benoît Daeninck
Stage 6 Tour de Bretagne, Cédric Pineau
Overall Ronde de l'Oise, Steven Tronet
2011
Grand Prix de la Ville de Lillers, Denis Flahaut
Stage 2 Tour du Loir-et-Cher, Pierre-Luc Périchon
Grand Prix de la ville de Pérenchies, Anthony Colin
2012
Stage 3 Mi-Août en Bretagne, Morgan Kneisky
Stage 3 Boucles de la Mayenne, Fabien Schmidt
2013
Stage 1 Ronde de l'Oise, Maxime Le Montagner
2014
Le Samyn, Maxime Vantomme
Stage 1 Rhône-Alpes Isère Tour, Quentin Jaurégui
Overall Paris–Arras Tour, Maxime Vantomme
Stage 1, Team time trial
2015
Kattekoers, Baptiste Planckaert
Stage 1 Circuit des Ardennes, Rudy Barbier
Paris–Chauny, Maxime Vantomme
Prologue Tour Alsace, Julien Antomarchi
Stage 2 Tour Alsace, Timothy Dupont
Mountains classification Tour du Poitou-Charentes, Rudy Kowalski
2016
Paris–Troyes, Rudy Barbier
Cholet-Pays de Loire, Rudy Barbier
2018
Stage 4 Tour de Bretagne, Julien Antomarchi
Grand Prix de la ville de Nogent-sur-Oise, Julien Antomarchi
2019
Overall Boucles de la Mayenne, Thibault Ferasse
Grand Prix de la ville de Nogent-sur-Oise, Emiel Vermeulen
2020
Overall La Tropicale Amissa Bongo, Jordan Levasseur
2021
Grand Prix de la ville de Pérenchies, Emiel Vermeulen

References

External links

UCI Continental Teams (Europe)
Cycling teams established in 2007
Cycling teams based in France